Subramaniyapuram  is a village in the Aranthangirevenue block of Pudukkottai district, Tamil Nadu, India.

Demographics 

 census, Subramaniyapuram had a total population of 968 with 412 males and 556 females. Out of the total population 710 people were literate.

References

Villages in Pudukkottai district